

The Green Sky Zippy Sport is an American single-seat single-engined monoplane designed by Ed Fisher of Raceair Designs and marketed for amateur construction by Green Sky Adventures of Hawthorne, Florida.

Development
The Zippy Sport is a single-seat, high-wing monoplane powered by a 50 hp (37 kW) Rotax 503 piston engine. Other engines have been fitted, including VW. Of mixed construction, it has a welded 4130 steel fuselage and wooden wings covered with doped aircraft fabric covering and fixed conventional landing gear. The wings are designed to be folded for storage or ground transport. The aircraft is available in the form of plans for  amateur construction.

Specifications

References

Notes

Bibliography

External links
 

1980s United States civil utility aircraft
Homebuilt aircraft
Green Sky Adventures aircraft
High-wing aircraft
Aircraft first flown in 1986